Danda is a frequently featured region in Hindu mythology, as in Dandaka, a kingdom and a forest bearing the same name. It was a colonial state of Lanka under the reign of Ravana. Ravana's governor Khara ruled this province. It was the stronghold of all the Rakshasa tribes living in the Dandaka Forest. It is roughly the Nashik District, Maharashtra with Janasthana (Nashik city) as its capital. It was from here that the Rakshasa Khara attacked Raghava Rama of Kosala, who lived with his wife and brother at Panchavati (modern day Nashik), not far away.

With reference to the demon Danda, in the Ramayana, he was the son of Sumali, thus making him Ravana's maternal uncle.

References in the Mahabharata 

Though Dandaka was mentioned in the epic Ramayana, with great detail, a few mentions of this kingdom are found in the epic Mahabharata.

Sahadeva's conquests 

Sahadeva, the Pandava general, and younger brother of Pandava king Yudhishthira, came to southern regions to collect tribute for the Rajasuya sacrifice of the king. Having acquired jewels and wealth from king Rukmin (ruling at the second capital of Vidarbha, named Bhojakata), he marched further south to Surparaka, Talakata, and the Dandakas. The Kuru warrior then vanquished and subjugated numberless kings of the Mlechchha tribe living on the sea coast (2,30).

Dandaka Forest 

The forest of Dandaka was the biggest forest in ancient India, Dandakaranya. It stretched from Vindhya ranges in central Indian to the banks of river Krishnavenna (now known as river Krishna) and Tungabhadra in the south. Mention of this forest is found in Mahabharata at (3-85). The sacred forest of Dandaka is mentioned here along with its possible boundaries and the rivers flowing within it. Surparaka (North Konkan) probably formed its western boundary.  Mahendra Mountains in Orissa formed its eastern boundary. The rivers Godavari, and Krishnavenna run through this forest. the river or lake Payoshni is mentioned at the northern entrance of this forest. In epic Ramayana no kingdom except the Dandaka kingdom and Kishkindha Kingdom is mentioned as lying within this forest. During epic Mahabharata many regions that was formerly Dandaka forest were found to be habitable kingdoms. Dandaka Kingdom was a kingdom of Rakshasas in the midst of the Dandaka forests.

Raghava Rama lived for some time in the forest of Dandaka, from desire of slaying the Rakshasas. At Janasthana (the capital of Dandaka Kingdom ) he cut off the head of a wicked-souled Rakshasa (as per epic Ramayana, his name was Khara) with a razor-headed shaft of great sharpness (9,39). Raghava Rama, that foremost of bowmen, taking his bow and in company with his queen (Sita) and brother (Lakshmana), with the view of compassing his father’s welfare, began to reside in the Dandaka forest.  From Janasthana (the capital of Dandaka Kingdom ), that mighty Rakshasa monarch, the wicked Ravana, carried away Rama’s queen. (3,146). A southern path through the Dandaka woods existed during the time of Raghava Rama. He travelled through this path in search of his wife, abducted by Ravana. Many uninhabited asylums of ascetics, scattered over with seats of Kusa grass and umbrellas of leaves and broken water-pots, and abounding with hundreds of jackals were seen along that path.(3,277).

See also 
Dandakaranya
Kingdoms of Ancient India

References 

Mahabharata of Krishna Dwaipayana Vyasa, translated to English by Kisari Mohan Ganguli
Ramayana of Valmiki

External links

Kingdoms in the Ramayana
Kingdoms in the Mahabharata
Rakshasa in the Ramayana